Engineer Kochin's Error, is a 1939 Soviet thriller directed by Aleksandr Macheret.

Plot 
The film tells about the engineer of the Moscow aviation plant Cochin, who took with him the secret blueprints, for which foreign intelligence hunts.

Starring 
 Mikhail Zharov as Lartsev
 Sergey Nikonov
 Lyubov Orlova as Kseniya Lebedeva
 Nikolai Dorokhin as Kochin
 Boris Petker		
 Faina Ranevskaya	
 Leonid Kmit
 Pyotr Leontyev as Galkin

References

External links 
 

1939 films
1930s Russian-language films
1930s thriller films
Soviet black-and-white films
Soviet thriller films